Leo Rubinfien (born 1953) is an American photographer and essayist who lives and works in New York City. Rubinfien first came to prominence as part of the circle of artist-photographers who investigated new color techniques and materials in the 1970s.

Among his principal bodies of photography are A Map of The East (1992), which explores the character and idiosyncrasies of Japan, China and Southeast Asia; and Wounded Cities (2008), which explores the "mental wounds" that were left by the terror attacks in New York City in 2001, and other attacks in cities around the world. He has had a solo exhibition at the National Museum of Modern Art, Tokyo. He has also curated exhibitions.

Rubinfien is also a writer, who has published essays on major photographers of the 20th century. He contributed a memoir, Colors of Daylight to Starburst: Color Photography in America, 1970-1980 (2010). He is co-author of Shomei Tomatsu / Skin of the Nation (2004) and editor of Garry Winogrand (2013).

He is the recipient of a Guggenheim Fellowship and his work is held in the collection of the Metropolitan Museum of Art in New York City.

Publications

Books of photographs by Rubinfien
 A Map of the East. Boston: D.R. Godine, 1992 Thames & Hudson, Toshi Shuppan. .
 10 Takeoffs 5 Landings. Robert Mann Gallery, 1994. .
 Wounded Cities. Göttingen, Germany: Steidl, 2008. . Photographs and a personal and historical essay by Rubinfien in Wounded Cities, which recounts the attacks of September 11th, 2001 and the years that followed.
 The Ardbeg. Tokyo: Taka Ishii Gallery and Kurenboh, 2010. With an essay by Rubinfien. Edition of 1000 copies. Japanese and English text. 15 pages.
 Paths through the Global City. Stanford, CA: Iris & B. Gerald Cantor Center for Visual Arts, Stanford University, 2011.
 Kizu Tsuita no Machi = "Wounded Cities". Tokyo: National Museum of Modern Art, 2011.
 New Turns in Old Roads. Tokyo: Taka Ishii Gallery, 2014.

Publications edited by Rubinfien
 Shomei Tomatsu / Skin of the Nation. 2004. Rubinfien was co-author.
 Garry Winogrand. San Francisco Museum of Modern Art and Yale University, 2013. Rubinfien was editor and Author. Photographs by Garry Winogrand.

Publications with contributions by Rubinfien
 Starburst: Color Photography in America 1970-1980. Berlin: Hatje Cantz, 2010. By Kevin Moore. . With essays by Rubinfien and James Crump.
Shomei Tomatsu: Skin of the Nation. New Haven, CT: Yale University, 2004. By Rubinfien, Sandra S. Phillips, and John W. Dower. . With a preface by Daidō Moriyama.

Awards
1982: Guggenheim Fellowship from the John Simon Guggenheim Memorial Foundation
Japan Foundation fellowship
Asian Cultural Council fellowship
International Center for Advanced Studies at New York University fellowship
2009: Gold Prize at the 5th Lianzhou International Photography Festival

Collections 
 Metropolitan Museum of Art, New York City: 9 prints
Museum of Modern Art, New York: 1 print (as of November 2019)
Whitney Museum of American Art, New York: 2 prints (as of November 2019)

Exhibitions

Solo exhibitions
 1984: Philadelphia College of Art
 1993: Metropolitan Museum of Art, New York
 1993: Seibu Art Forum, Sezon Museum, Tokyo
 1994: Seattle Art Museum, Seattle, Washington
 1994: Cleveland Museum of Art
 1995: Artists' Loft & Gallery, Galveston, Texas
 2008: Corcoran Gallery of Art, Washington, D.C.
 2009: San Francisco Museum of Modern Art, San Francisco, CA
 2010: Kurenboh, Tokyo
 2011: Iris & B. Gerald Cantor Center for Visual Arts, Stanford University, Stanford, CA
 2011: National Museum of Modern Art, Tokyo
 2011: Yale University Art Gallery
 2011: Art Academy of Cincinnati
 2013: Museum of Contemporary Art of Rome, Rome

Curated exhibitions
2001–2004: Co-curator of the San Francisco Museum of Modern Art (SFMOMA)’s retrospective of the work of Shomei Tomatsu
2010: Curator of SFMOMA’s retrospective of the work of Garry Winogrand, which toured to the National Gallery of Art, Washington, the Metropolitan Museum of Art, New York and the Jeu de Paume, Paris, in 2014.

References 

1953 births
Living people
Reed College alumni
Yale University alumni
California Institute of the Arts alumni